is a railway station in Aoba-ku, Sendai, Miyagi Prefecture, Japan, operated by East Japan Railway Company (JR East).

Lines

Station layout
The station has a two opposed side platforms, connected to the station building by a level crossing. The station is unstaffed.

History
The station opened on 10 November 1937. The station was absorbed into the JR East network upon the privatization of Japanese National Railways (JNR) on 1 April 1987.

Surrounding area
Okunikkawa camp grounds
 Former Nikkawa mine

See also
 List of railway stations in Japan

External links

 

Stations of East Japan Railway Company
Railway stations in Sendai
Senzan Line
Railway stations in Japan opened in 1937